{{DISPLAYTITLE:IONIS-GCCRRx}}

IONIS-GCCRRx, also known as ISIS-426115, is an antiglucocorticoid which is under development by Ionis Pharmaceuticals (formerly Isis Pharmaceuticals) for the treatment of diabetes mellitus type 2. It has also been under investigation for the treatment of Cushing's syndrome, but no development has been reported. The drug is an antisense oligonucleotide against the glucocorticoid receptor. As of December 2017, it is in phase II clinical trials for diabetes mellitus type 2.

References 

Anti-diabetic drugs
Antiglucocorticoids
Antisense RNA
Drugs with undisclosed chemical structures
Experimental drugs
Therapeutic gene modulation